Bowsprit Moraine is a medial moraine,  long, off the northeast point of Elkhorn Ridge, where Towle Glacier and Northwind Glacier join Fry Glacier, in the Convoy Range, Victoria Land. It is one of a group of nautical names in Convoy Range: the mapped form of the moraine protrudes like a bowsprit out from the end of Elkhorn Ridge. It was named by a 1989–90 New Zealand Antarctic Research Programme field party.

References 

Moraines of the Ross Dependency
Landforms of Victoria Land